Rih or RIH may refer to:

 Rih (instrument), a Ukrainian instrument
 RIH (bicycle), a Dutch bicycle manufacturer
 Rih Dil, a lake in Chin State, Myanmar
 Rih, a fictional black horse belonging to Kara Ben Nemsi in the books of Karl May, it means “fast as the wind” in Arabic
 A short name for Barbadian singer Rihanna
 The NYSE symbol for Robert Half International, a staffing and human resources services firm.
Rhode Island Hospital, located in Providence, Rhode Island.